Noel Peter Fox (August 30, 1910 – June 3, 1987) was a United States district judge of the United States District Court for the Western District of Michigan.

Education and career

Born in Kalamazoo, Michigan, Fox received a Bachelor of Philosophy degree from Marquette University in 1933 and a Juris Doctor from Marquette University Law School in 1935. He was in private practice in Muskegon, Michigan from 1935 to 1937, and was then an assistant prosecuting attorney for Muskegon County, Michigan from 1937 to 1939, thereafter returning to his private practice until 1944. He was in the United States Navy towards the end of World War II, from 1944 to 1946, again returning to private practice from 1946 to 1951. He was a Circuit Judge for the Michigan 14th Judicial Circuit Court from 1951 to 1962.

Federal judicial service

On July 12, 1962, Fox was nominated by President John F. Kennedy to a seat on the United States District Court for the Western District of Michigan vacated by Judge Raymond Wesley Starr. Fox was confirmed by the United States Senate on July 25, 1962, and received his commission on July 31, 1962. He served as Chief Judge from 1971 to 1979, assuming senior status on December 31, 1979. Fox continued to serve in that capacity until his death on June 3, 1987, in Grand Rapids, Michigan.

References

Sources
 

1910 births
1987 deaths
People from Kalamazoo, Michigan
Michigan state court judges
Judges of the United States District Court for the Western District of Michigan
United States district court judges appointed by John F. Kennedy
20th-century American judges
Marquette University alumni
Marquette University Law School alumni
United States Navy sailors